The Raven is a 2012 American crime thriller film directed by James McTeigue, produced by Marc D. Evans, Trevor Macy and Aaron Ryder and written by Ben Livingston and Hannah Shakespeare. Set in 1849, it is a fictionalized account detailing the last days of Edgar Allan Poe's life, in which the poet and author helps the police pursue a serial killer, whose murders mirror those in his stories. While the plot of the film is fictional, the writers based it on some accounts of real situations surrounding Edgar Allan Poe's mysterious death. Poe is said to have repeatedly called out the name "Reynolds" on the night before his death, though it is unclear to whom he was referring. The film stars John Cusack, Alice Eve, Brendan Gleeson and Luke Evans. Its title derives from Poe's 1845 poem "The Raven", in a similar manner to the earlier unrelated 1935 and 1963 films.

The Raven was released in the United Kingdom on March 9, 2012, and in the United States on April 27, 2012, by Relativity Media. The film received mixed reviews from critics, who praised the visual effects and score by Lucas Vidal, but criticized the performances and plot twists.

Plot
In 19th-century Baltimore, Maryland, several policemen discover a murdered woman sprawled on the floor of her apartment, which was locked from the inside. While police search for the killer's means of escape, they discover a second corpse in the chimney, later identified as the 12-year-old daughter of the first victim. A celebrated detective, Emmett Fields, is called to assist in the investigation and discovers that the crime resembles a fictional murder in a short story, "The Murders in the Rue Morgue", that he once read.

The writer Edgar Allan Poe is brought to Fields for questioning. After finding the body of Griswold, a rival of Poe, cut in half by a pendulum (as in Poe's story "The Pit and the Pendulum"), the pair deduce that someone is staging murders based on Poe's stories. Edgar's love, Emily Hamilton, is kidnapped at her father's masquerade ball, like the one described in Poe's "The Masque of the Red Death". The killer taunts Poe in a note, demanding that Edgar write and publish a new story. Poe's lodgings are burned down by people who believe he is exploiting the murders for his own journalistic ends, and he is forced to move in with Fields.

A clue from the killer referring to "The Cask of Amontillado" leads Poe and Fields to search the tunnels under the city with several policemen, discovering the walled-up corpse of a man dressed as Emily. They determine that the man is a sailor, and the clues on his body bring the pursuers to Holy Cross Church, where an empty grave with Emily's name on it has been prepared. As the police attempt to break down the church doors, the killer attacks and kills one of the policemen, then shoots and wounds Fields. Poe gives chase on horseback, but the killer escapes.

Poe writes one last newspaper column, offering his life for Emily's, suggesting that he could take poison. In the morning, the maid gives Poe a letter from the killer, accepting his terms, but the note was delivered long before the paper was distributed. Realizing that the killer must work at the paper, Poe races to confront his editor, Henry, but Henry is already dead, another note lying next to him.

The real killer is the paper's typesetter, Ivan Reynolds, who congratulates Poe and offers him a drink. Ivan attempts to converse with Edgar, but Poe demands Emily's location. Ivan pours a vial of poison, promising to end the story as Poe had written it. Poe agrees and drinks the liquid. Ivan quotes "The Tell-Tale Heart", cluing Edgar that Emily is concealed beneath the printing floor. As the killer leaves, Poe uses the last of his strength to tear up a false section of floor and open a trapdoor leading to Emily's prison.

Poe rescues Emily, and they share a poignant moment before she is taken away by ambulance. Delirious from the poison, Edgar wanders off to a park bench to die. A man walking in the park recognizes him as the famous writer, and asks if he is all right. Poe can summon only enough strength to say, "Tell Fields his last name is Reynolds." Later, when Fields comes to view Poe's corpse at the hospital, the attending physician is unable to tell him the exact cause of death, but mentions that the writer was incoherent, insisting that "his last name is Reynolds." Fields ponders the meaning of the phrase, slowly connecting the dots. The Hamiltons attend Poe's burial.

Ivan disembarks from a train in Paris. As a porter carries his luggage, Ivan climbs into a carriage and is confronted by Fields. He lunges for the detective, and Fields shoots him at point-blank range.

Cast
 John Cusack as Edgar Allan Poe
 Luke Evans as Inspector Emmett Fields
 Alice Eve as Emily Hamilton
 Brendan Gleeson as Captain Charles Hamilton
 Oliver Jackson-Cohen as PC John Cantrell
 Jimmy Yuill as Captain Eldridge
 Kevin McNally as Henry Maddux
 Sam Hazeldine as Ivan Reynolds
 Pam Ferris as Mrs. Bradley
 John Warnaby as Ludwig Griswold (a reference to Rufus Wilmot Griswold who used the pen name Ludwig)
 Brendan Coyle as Reagan

Production
Jeremy Renner was originally going to star in the film (playing the role later taken by Luke Evans), but he dropped out so that he could star in Mission: Impossible – Ghost Protocol. Ewan McGregor was also in talks for a role, but he also dropped out. Joaquin Phoenix was also approached to star at one point. On August 28, 2010, it was confirmed that John Cusack would play Edgar Allan Poe in the film.

The filming began on November 9, 2010 in Belgrade and Budapest. The first images from the set were revealed on November 15, 2010. A trailer for the film was released online October 7, 2011. This date is significant because it also marks the anniversary of Poe's death at age 40 in 1849. In 2011 Relativity acquired U.S. rights for only $4 million.

Reception

Critical response 
On Rotten Tomatoes, the film holds a rating of 22% based on 141 reviews, with an average rating of 4.6/10. The site's critics consensus states: "Thinly scripted, unevenly acted, and overall preposterous, The Raven disgraces the legacy of Edgar Allen  Poe with a rote murder mystery that's more silly than scary." On Metacritic, the film has a weighted average score of 44 out of 100, based on 30 critics, indicating "mixed or average reviews". Audiences polled by CinemaScore gave the film an average grade of "B" on an A+ to F scale.

James Berardinelli gave the film two and a half stars out of four, writing: "The Raven looks great and is well-paced, but a lack of a compelling resolution makes it an anemic effort." Mick LaSalle of the San Francisco Chronicle wrote, "The story has its moments, and yet there is something about this tale ... that doesn't completely satisfy."
Richard Roeper, however, was more positive towards the film, awarding it a B+.

Box office 
The Raven grossed $16 million in the United States and Canada, and $13.7 million in other territories, for a worldwide total of $29.7 million.

The film was projected to gross $8–10 million in its opening weekend, with comparisons to the similarly-themed Jack the Ripper film From Hell, which opened to $11 million in October 2001. It ended up debuting to $7.3 million, finishing seventh at the box office. The audience skewed male (52%) and older (59% over 25 years old). It fell 64% to $2.6 million in its second weekend.

See also

 Edgar Allan Poe bibliography
 Edgar Allan Poe in popular culture
 The Pale Blue Eye

References

External links
 
 
 
 

2012 films
2012 drama films
2012 thriller films
2010s American films
2010s English-language films
2010s historical drama films
2010s historical thriller films
American detective films
American historical drama films
American historical thriller films
American serial killer films
Cultural depictions of Edgar Allan Poe
FilmNation Entertainment films
Films about kidnapping
Films about death
Films about writers
Films based on The Raven
Films based on The Murders in the Rue Morgue
Films based on works by Edgar Allan Poe
Films directed by James McTeigue
Films scored by Lucas Vidal
Films set in the 1840s
Films set in 1849
Films set in Baltimore
Films shot in Belgrade
Films shot in Budapest
Gothic horror films
Intrepid Pictures films
Relativity Media films